Albert Edward Hohol (December 27, 1922 – November 17, 2017) was a provincial level politician from Alberta, Canada. He was a member of the Legislative Assembly of Alberta from 1971 to 1979, sitting in the governing Progressive Conservative caucus. He served a couple of cabinet portfolios under the Peter Lougheed government.

Political career
Hohol ran for a seat to the Alberta Legislature in the 1971 Alberta general election. He faced a tough race against future Member of Parliament Werner Schmidt and future MLA Gordon Wright. Hohol won the new district by a comfortable majority to pick up the seat for the Progressive Conservative party who formed government in that election.

Premier Peter Lougheed appointed Hohol to the Executive Council of Alberta to serve in his first cabinet. He was given the Minister of Labour and Manpower portfolio. Hohol ran for re-election in the 1975 Alberta general election with ministerial advantage. He was returned to his second term with a landslide. He increased his popular vote while the opposition vote collapsed.

After the election Lougheed changed Hohol's portfolio. He became the Minister of Advanced Education and Manpower. He took over advanced education and kept the manpower portion of his portfolio while giving the Labour portion to Neil Crawford. He retired from provincial politics at dissolution of the assembly in 1979. Hohol died at the age of 94 on November 17, 2017.

References

External links
Legislative Assembly of Alberta Members Listing

1922 births
2017 deaths
Members of the Executive Council of Alberta
People from Two Hills, Alberta
Progressive Conservative Association of Alberta MLAs